The Ministry of Human Rights and Refugees of Bosnia and Herzegovina is the governmental department which oversees the human rights of the citizens of Bosnia and Herzegovina and refugees.

History
Following the independence of Bosnia and Herzegovina in 1992, the Ministry of Human Rights and Refugees began to operate at the level of the newly established Republic of Bosnia and Herzegovina. After the end of the Bosnian War, and the signing of the Dayton Agreement, the Ministry of Human Rights and Refugees of the Federation of Bosnia and Herzegovina and the Ministry of Human Rights and Refugees of the Republika Srpska started functioning like the present-day national Ministry of Human Rights and Refugees.

In 2000, the both entity Ministries of Human Rights and Refugees merged into the Ministry of Human Rights and Refugees of Bosnia and Herzegovina, with Martin Raguž becoming the first minister.

Responsibilities
The main person in the Ministry of Human Rights and Refugees of Bosnia and Herzegovina is the Minister of Human Rights and Refugees of Bosnia and Herzegovina, who is entitled to one assistant and one secretary.

The Ministry of Human Rights and Refugees has the authority to administer and oversee the following:
care for refugees, displaced persons, readmission and housing policy,
insuring human rights,
emigration,
reconstruction, development, monitoring and regional centers (RC).

List of ministers

Ministers of Human Rights and Refugees (2000–present)

Political parties:

References

External links

Human Rights and Refugees
Human Rights
Bosnia and Herzegovina, Human Rights and Refugees
2000 establishments in Bosnia and Herzegovina